Yarova is an urban-type settlement in Kramatorsk Raion of Donetsk Oblast, Ukraine. Population:  

Russian forces took control of Yarova during the 2022 Russian invasion of Ukraine; the settlement was recaptured by Ukraine on 19 September 2022.

References

Urban-type settlements in Kramatorsk Raion